Parthenius II may refer to:

 Parthenius II of Constantinople, Ecumenical Patriarch of Constantinople in 1644–1646 and 1648–1651
 Parthenius II of Alexandria, Greek Patriarch of Alexandria in 1788–1805